Arnar is a given name. Notable people with the name include:

Arnar Førsund, Norwegian footballer
Arnar Grétarsson (born 1972), Icelandic football player
Arnar Guðjónsson, Icelandic basketball coach
Arnar Gunnlaugsson (born 1973), Icelandic professional footballer
Arnar Jónsson (actor) (born 1943), Icelandic actor
Arnar Jónsson (basketball) (born 1983), Icelandic basketball player
Arnar Sigurðsson (born 1981), Icelandic tennis player
Arnar Viðarsson (born 1978), Icelandic football player
Guðjón Arnar Kristjánsson (born 1944), Icelandic MP and chairman of the Liberal Party (Frjálslyndi flokkurinn)
Jón Arnar Magnússon (born 1969), decathlete from Iceland
Viktor Arnar Ingólfsson (born 1955), Icelandic writer of crime fiction

Other uses include:

Arnar Stadium, all-seater stadium in Ijevan, Armenia, built in 2007

Icelandic masculine given names